The Maritime Transport Act 1994 defines the statutory powers of Maritime New Zealand.

External links
Text of the Act
New Zealand Maritime Law

Statutes of New Zealand
1994 in New Zealand law
Water transport in New Zealand
Transport law in New Zealand
History of transport in New Zealand
1994 in transport
Maritime history of New Zealand
Transport legislation